The GuitarViol is an interpretation of the Arpeggione (bowed guitar) built by guitarist/luthier Jonathan Eric Wilson. It has six strings, 24 frets (a.k.a. “stopping points”), and is tuned E2–A2–D3–G3–B3–E4 (standard guitar tuning), though some models are tuned to  B1–E2–A2–D3–F#3–B3 (baritone guitar tuning). It is most often played in a semi-diagonal, guitar-like playing position and bowed with an underhand (palm up) “German” bow grip manner similar to Viola da Gamba. GuitarViols exist in solid body electric, semi-acoustic, and acoustic configurations. Since the early 2000s, GuitarViols have been predominantly used by media composers in TV/Film/video game soundtrack industry. Notable examples of prominent GuitarViol use include movies such as 300 and all seasons of Game of Thrones (with the exception of the main theme introduction track). Wilson himself can be heard in Borderlands (video game) and his solo film library album “GuitarViol” (Lakeshore Records 2012).

GuitarViols are built under the TogaMan brand by GuitarViols inc. (founded by Jonathan Eric Wilson) in Fillmore, CA. The “TogaMan” is a reference to a toga/tunic tenor viol player portrayed in Paolo Veronese’s “Noces de Cana” painting that depicts a similar bow grip and playing position seen in GuitarViols today.

Notable media composer GuitarViol players include Tyler Bates, Loga Ramin Torkian, Kevin Kiner, Ramin Djawadi, Heitor Pereira, Charlie Clouser, Gary Lionelli, Brian Tyler, Jeff Cardoni, and Justin Melland, among others.

References

External links
Official website

Viol family instruments
Guitar family instruments